The Jiao Province Campaign, also known as the Jiaozhi Rebellion (Chinese: 交阯之亂; Vietnamese: Giao Chỉ chi loạn), was a military conflict between the states of Eastern Wu and Cao Wei from 264 to 266 and later between Wu and the Western Jin from 266 to 271 during the Three Kingdoms period of China. The conflict was initially a local rebellion against Wu in Jiaozhi Commandery in 263, but in 264, Wei (replaced by Jin in 266) intervened and took large parts of Wu's territory in Jiao and Guang provinces (廣州; covering present-day Guangdong and Guangxi). Wu went on the counteroffensive in 268, and by 271, they drove out the Jin forces and recovered all their lost territory. The campaign would be one of the last major victories of Wu during the final years of the Three Kingdoms.

Background 
During the Three Kingdoms period, the Eastern Wu controlled the region of Jiao province or Jiaozhou, which encompassed northern Vietnam and Liangguang. It was composed of nine commanderies: Gaoliang (高涼郡; around present-day Yangjiang, Guangdong), Yulin, Cangwu, Nanhai, Zhuya, Hepu, Jiaozhi, Jiuzhen, and Rinan. Under the Wu regime, Jiao experienced a number of revolts led by the province's local inhabitants. In 231, the Lạc Việt people in Jiuzhen rebelled, and more famously in 248, Lady Triệu led a rebellion against Wu in Jiuzhen and Jiaozhi. However, Wu was able to quell both rebellions.

The campaign

Lã Hưng's Rebellion (263–264) 
In 262, the Wu emperor, Sun Xiu, sent the official, Deng Xun (鄧荀), to Jiaozhi to gather peacocks and wild boars. Previously, the Prefect of Jiaozhi, Sun Xu (孫諝) had sent thousands of craftsmen from the commandery to work in the capital, Jianye. When the people of Jiaozhi saw Deng Xun arrive, they thought that more of them were going to be forced to work in Jianye. According to another account, Sun Xu was a corrupt and cruel administrator who was deeply unpopular in Jiaozhi. After Deng Xun arrived, Deng Xun gathered 30 peacocks without imperial authority, and ordered the locals to escort the birds to Jianye. Regardless of which account is true, in May 263, a county official, Lã Hưng (呂興; Lü Xing) incited the people and soldiers of Jiaozhi to revolt, and the rebels killed both Sun Xu and Deng Xun.

When the rebellion first broke out, Wu was unable to immediately respond, as at the time, the state of Cao Wei launched an invasion against Wu's ally, Shu Han. Wu sent its armies to divert Wei's attention from Shu, but after Shu fell, they attempted to claim Shu's former territories, which ended in failure. Sun Xiu died in September 264. Before his death, he established Guang province with the four commanderies in northern Jiao, namely Nanhai, Cangwu, Gaoliang, and Yulin.

Lã Hưng's rebellion inspired Jiuzhen and Rinan to also rebel. Lã Hưng led his troops to Hepu in hopes that the people there would also revolt. After the fall of Shu, he sent his Commandant, Đường Phổ (唐譜; Tang Pu), to Jincheng (進乘; in present-day Pingbian Miao Autonomous County, Yunnan) to reach out to Cao Wei's Chief Controller of Nanzhong, Huo Yi, for help. Huo Yi sent a letter to the Wei capital, Luoyang, to report on the matter and received a reply from the court in September 264. Lã Hưng was appointed the General Who Stabilises the South and Chief Controller of Jiao while Huo Yi was appointed Inspector of Jiao and given discretion over the province. Despite his office, Huo Yi would administer the province remotely from Nanzhong. He requested that a native of Jianning (建寧; around present-day Qujing, Yunnan), Cuan Gu be made Prefect of Jiaozhi, and dispatched him along with many other generals, most of whom formerly served Shu, to help Lã Hưng. However, before Wei forces could arrive, Lã Hưng was assassinated by his Officer of Merit, Lý Tống (李統; Li Tong).

Jin's Jiao Campaign (265–268) 
In 265, Cuan Gu set out from Nanzhong to Longbian County to appease Jiaozhi and the other Wei-aligned territories. In February 266, Sima Yan (Emperor Wu of Jin) established the Western Jin dynasty, replacing Cao Wei. Huo Yi, Cuan Gu and the others thus became Jin subjects. Shortly after Jin formed, Cuan Gu died, so Huo Yi replaced him with Ma Rong (馬融). Later, Ma Rong also died of illness, so he was replaced with Yang Ji. After two years of administration, Jin consolidated its control over Jiaozhi and Jiuzhen, and they were also on the verge of taking Rinan. Jin's success in Jiao supposedly caused widespread unease throughout Wu's domain north of Hepu.

First Wu counteroffensive (268) 
In 268, the Wu emperor, Sun Hao, launched a counteroffensive against Jin to reclaim Jiao. He sent the Inspector of Jiao, Liu Jun (劉俊), the Grand Commander, Xiu Ze (脩則) and the general Gu Rong (顧容) to attack the province. The Wu generals carried out three attacks, and in all three of them, they were defeated by Yang Ji. The commanderies of Yulin and Jiuzhen also sided with Yang Ji during the conflict. Yang Ji sent his generals, Dong Yuan (董元) and Mao Jiong (毛炅) to attack Hepu. The Jin and Wu force clashed at Gucheng, where Jin scored a great victory, killing Liu Jun and Xiu Ze in the process. The remaining Wu soldiers scattered and fled back to Hepu. Mao Jiong was appointed Administrator of Yulin while Dong Yuan was appointed Administrator of Jiuzhen. Also, around this time, the southern states of Lâm Ấp and Funan sent tributes to Jin as a sign of friendship.

Second Wu counteroffensive (269–271)

Initial stages 
In 269, Sun Hao launched a second counteroffensive, this time sending two armies. The first army, led by Yu Si and Xue Xu, marched through the roads Jing province while the second army, led by Li Xu (李勗) and Xu Cun (徐存) marched along the coast from Jian'an. The two armies would meet at Hepu to attack Jiaozhi. However, Li Xu's army had trouble moving along the coastline, and after killing his guide general, Feng Fei (馮斐), Li Xu led his army to return. The minister He Ding (何定), accused Li Xu of killing Feng Fei and withdrawing without authorization. As a result, Sun Hao had Li Xu, Xu Cun and their families executed.

The army from Jing were thus left to fight the couteroffensive on their own. After they reached Hepu, Wu's Administrator of Cangwu, Tao Huang volunteered to lead an attack against Yang Ji at the Fen River (分水), but he was defeated and lost two generals in the battle. His superior, Xue Xu, was furious at him for his defeat, and was considering withdrawing from the province. However, later that night, Tao Huang launched a night raid against Dong Yuan and won a great victory, capturing much of the enemy's treasure before returning. The victory shifted Xue Xu's attitude towards Tao Huang, so much so that he decided to give Tao Huang command over the campaign.

Battle of Jiaozhi 
In April 271, Yu Si led his army to attack and kill Dong Yuan, so Yang Ji appointed Wang Su (王素) as the new Prefect of Jiuzhen. Tao Huang used the loot from his battle with Dong Yuan to bribe a powerful leader of the Fuyan barbarians (扶嚴夷), Lương Kỳ (梁奇; Liang Qi) to help him, and Lương Kỳ brought with him more than 10,000 people. Instead of marching head-on to Jiaozhi, Xue Xu employed Tao Huang's strategy to use a sea route and catch the Jin army by surprise. Yang Ji sent Mao Jiong and Meng Yue (孟岳) to fight Wu, but they were badly routed at Fengxi (封溪, in present-day Đông Anh, Hanoi). During the battle, the Jin generals feigned a retreat and attempted to ambush the Wu army. However, Tao Huang saw through their ruse, and he used soldiers with long jis to defeat the ambush.

Yang Ji, Mao Jiong and the others fled back to Jiaozhi to defend the city. Tao Huang's army surrounded Jiaozhi and cut off the city's supply. By July 271, the rations in Jiaozhi had run out, and more than half of the city's population had died of hunger or disease. Soon, Tao Huang received the surrender of the city's garrison general, Wang Yue (王約). Jiaozhi was being attacked from within and outside, and more than 2,000 Jin defenders were killed along with the generals Zhang Deng (張登), Meng Tong (孟通) and Shao Hui (邵暉), while Yang Ji, Mao Jiong and the others were captured. For his deeds, Tao Huang was officially made Inspector of Jiao by Sun Hao.

Battle of Jiuzhen 
Hearing the disastrous defeat at Jiaozhi, Wang Su and other Jin generals planned to abandon Jiao and flee back to Nanzhong. However, along the way, they were all captured by Tao Huang's general, Wei Pu (衛濮). The Jin Officer of Merit, Li Zuo (李祚) and Commandant, Shao Yin (邵胤), led their troops to defend Jiuzhen. Li Zuo's uncle, Li Huang (黎晃), who was a Wu general, advised him to surrender, but he refused. Tao Huang led his army to capture Jiuzhen, and after facing stiff resistance, he eventually captured the commandery. Not long after, Rinan and the other counties under Wei surrendered, and Jiao province was back under Wu's control.

Aftermath 
Sun Hao declared a general amnesty and divided Jiaozhi into Xinchang Commandery (新昌郡; around present-day Northern Vietnam) and new Jiaozhi to consolidate his control over Jiao. The Wu army soon clashed with the Fuyan people, but Wu pacified them and set up Wuping Commandery (武平郡; around present-day Northern Vietnam) in their territory. Tao Huang remained the Inspector of Jiao, and during his tenure, he formed Jiude Commandery (九德郡; around present-day North Central Coast, Vietnam) and introduced more than thirty counties in Jiuzhen. Tao Huang was lauded by the people of Jiao as a benevolent administrator, and no rebellion occurred in the province for the remainder of Wu's existence. On the other hand, Lâm Ấp and Funan resumed their hostilies towards Wu, and Tao Huang would often clash with Lâm Ấp's forces for the next ten years.

Wu's victory in Jiao was one of their few major victories against Jin along with the Battle of Xiling in 272. Yet, despite reclaiming the province, they were unable to turn the tide of the war, and just ten years later, Jin would conquer Wu in 280, ending the Three Kingdoms period.

References 

 Chen, Shou. Records of the Three Kingdoms (Sanguozhi).
 Chang Qu (4th century). Chronicles of Huayang (Huayang Guo Zhi).
 Fang, Xuanling. Book of Jin (Jin Shu).
 Pei, Songzhi. Annotations to Records of the Three Kingdoms (Sanguozhi zhu).
 Sima, Guang. Zizhi Tongjian.

260s conflicts
270s conflicts
Jiao province